West Orange High School may refer to:

 West Orange High School (Florida), located in Winter Garden, Florida
 West Orange High School (New Jersey), located in West Orange, New Jersey
 West Orange-Stark High School, located in West Orange, Texas; known as West Orange High School before 1977